Sunim is the Korean title for a Buddhist monk or Buddhist nun. It is considered respectful to refer to senior monks or nuns in Korea as Kun sunim. In most Korean temples, a middle-aged monk assumes the role of a juji sunim, who serves administrative functions. The eldest sunim is typically seen as a symbolic leader of the younger sunims.

See also
Ajari
Acharya

References

Zen
Buddhist titles